REAC may refer to a number of different things:
 REAC, the common abbreviation for the Reeves Electronic Analog Computer, a series of early computers produced by Reeves Instrument Corporation
 Rákospalotai EAC, a Hungarian football club whose name is often abbreviated as REAC